Sydney Putman (25 March 1912 – 20 September 1947) was an Australian cricketer. He played 21 first-class matches for Tasmania between 1930 and 1939.

See also
 List of Tasmanian representative cricketers

References

External links
 

1912 births
1947 deaths
Australian cricketers
Tasmania cricketers
Cricketers from Hobart